Data vault or Data Vault may refer to:

Data vault modeling,  a database modeling method
Data vaulting, or off-site data protection
DataVault or Data Vault, an early massive data storage system
Data Vault, product of Personal, Inc.
Data Vault, product of Callpod